This is a list of districts of Lesotho by Human Development Index as of 2021.

References 

Lesotho
Human Development Index
Districts by Human Development Index
HDI